This is the discography of Simon Rattle and other produced works by the English conductor.

Discography

With Berliner Philharmoniker

With Birmingham Symphony Orchestra and Birmingham Contemporary Music Group

Adams, John
Harmonielehre
Chairman Dances
2 Fanfares: Tromba Lontana & Short Ride In A Fast Machine
Adès, Thomas
Asyla
Arnold, Malcolm
Guitar Concerto Bream (guitar)
Bartók, Bela
Violin Concerto no 2 Chung (violin)
2 Rhapsodies Chung (violin)
Concerto for 2 Pianos Labeque sisters (pianos)
Sonata for 2 Pianos Labeque sisters (pianos)
Concerto For Orchestra
The Miraculous Mandarin
Piano Concertos 1, 2 & 3 Donohoe(pno)
Beethoven, Ludwig van
Piano Concertos 1 & 2 Vogt (pno)
Berg, Alban
Lulu Suite Auger (soprano)
Bernstein, Leonard
Wonderful Town Birmingham Contemporary Music Group (BCMG)
Brahms, Johannes
 Piano Concerto No. 1 Andsnes (pno)
Piano Quartet No. 1 (orch. Schoenberg)
Britten, Benjamin
American Overture
Ballad Of Heroes op.14 1 -3
Canadian Overture
Cello Concerto Mork(cello) Virgin
Diversions for Piano & Orchestra (Left hand)1-11
Occasional Overture
Praise We Great Men
Quatre Chansons Franaises
Scottish Ballad op. 26
Sinfonia De Requiem
Suite On English Folk Tunes; A Time There Was...
The Building of The House; Overture
War Requiem
Young Apollo
Russian Funeral
Young Person's Guide to the Orchestra
Bruckner, Anton
Symphony No. 7
Carter, Elliott
A Celebration Of 100x150 Notes
Doyle, Patrick
Henry V Original Sound Track (Kenneth Branagh film)
Debussy, Claude
Jeux
Images
Le Roi Lear
Elgar, Edward
Dream Of Gerontius
Violin Concerto Kennedy (vln)
Violin Concerto Ida Haendel (vln) CBSO (Rec Live 22nd Feb 1984, Royal Festival Hall, London) Testament
Enigma Variations
Grania & Diarmid
Falstaff
Cello Concerto Mork (cello) Virgin
Ellington, Duke
Classic Ellington Various jazz stars Joe Lovano/Geri Allen/Clarke Terry/Lena Horne etc.
Gershwin, George
Piano Concerto Donohoe (pno)
Song Book Donohoe (pno)
Rhapsody in Blue Donohoe (pno)
Goldschmitt, Berthold
Passacaglia
Ciaccona Sinfonica Decca
Grainger, Percy
In a Nutshell
Train Music
Country Gardens
Lincs Posy
The Warriors
 Pagodes (Debussy arr. Grainger)
 La Vallee Des Cloches (Ravel arr. Grainger)
Grieg, Edward
Piano Concerto Vogt (pno)
Haydn, Franz Joseph
The Creation
Symphonies 22/86/102
Symphonies 60/70/90
Henze, Hans Werner
Symphony 7
Barcarolle
Holt Simon
Boots of Lead (from CD Boots of Lead, Feet of Clay) NMC
Janacek, Leos
Glagolitic Mass Palmer (Soprano) EMI
Knussen, Oliver
Flourish With Fireworks
Liszt, Franz
Piano Concertos no 1 Ousset (pno)
Mahler, Gustav
Symphony 1/Blumine
Symphony 2
Symphony 3
Symphony 4
Symphony 6
Symphony 7
Symphony 8
Das Klagende Lied
Das Lied von der Erde  Hampson/Seiffert(tenors)
8 Lieder from Das Knaben Wunderhorn
Maw, Nicholas
Odyssey 
Messiaen, Olivier
Turangalila Symphony
Nielsen, Carl
Symphony no 4(Inextinguishable)
Pan & Syrinx
Prokofiev, Sergei
Symphony no 5
Scythian Suite
Rachmaninov, Sergei
Piano Concerto 2 Ousset (piano)
Paganini Rhapsody Ousset (piano)
Symphonic Dances
Vocalise
Ravel, Maurice
The 2 Piano Concertos Ousset (piano)
Scherezade
La Valse
Fanfare
Alborada del Gracioso
Mother Goose
Valley of Bells
Daphnis et Chloe
Bolero
Rodrigo, Joaquin
Concierto de Aranjuez Bream (gtr)
Saint-Saëns, Camille
Piano Concerto no 2 (Cecile Ousset Piano)
Schoenberg, Arnold
Erwartung BCMG
Chamber Symphony 1
Variations for Orch BCMG
5 Orch Pieces BCMG
A Survivor From Warsaw
Schumann, Robert
Piano Concerto (Lars Vogt Piano)
Shostakovich, Dimitri
Symphony 4
Sibelius, Jean
Symphonies 1,2,3,4,5,6 & 7
Oceanides
Scene with Cranes
Violin Concerto Kennedy(violin)
Violin Concerto Haendel, Ida (Violin) CBSO (rec 7th Sept 1993 Proms)
Stockhausen, Karlheinz
Gruppen See DVD Leaving Home Complete Live DVD performance
Stravinsky, Igor
Petrushka
Apollo
Symphony in 3 Movements
4 Studies
Firebird
Scherzo a la Russe (jazz band version)
Scherzo a la Russe Orch version
4 Studies
Rite of Spring
Szymanowski, Karol
King Roger
Symphony 4
Songs of a Fairy Princess
Harnasie
Love Songs of Hafiz
Stabat Mater
Symphony 3
Litany to the Virgin Mary
Violin Concertos 1/2
Takemitsu, Toru
 To The Edge Of A Dream Bream (guitar)
Turnage, Mark Antony
Drowned out BCMG
Momentum BCMG
kai BCMG
3 Screaming Popes BCMG
Vaughan Williams, Ralph
Songs of Travel Hampson/Tear(tenors)
On Wenlock Edge Hampson/Tear(tenors)
Lark Ascending Kennedy (violin)
Walton, William
Symphony 1
Cello Concerto Lyn Harrell (cello)
Belshazzar's Feast Hampson (tenor)
Webern, Anton
6 Orchestral Pieces BCMG
Weill, Kurt
7 Deadly Sins
Various Composers
Leaving Home 1 – Rhythm/Eastern Europe/After the Wake music from the channel 4 series
excerpts from:
Stravinsky
Rite Of Spring (Conclusion)
Varese
Ionisation (Conclusion)
Boulez
Rituel In Memoriam Bruno Moderna (Sections 1- 7)
Mahler
Das Lied von Der Erde (6th Movement) Amanda Roorcroft (mezzo sop.)
Messiaen
Turangalila Symphony (6th Movement)
Bartók
Lake Of Tears (Bluebeard's Castle)(Willard White; bass/Anne Sofie von Otter Mezzo Sop)
Music For Strings, Percussion & Celeste (2nd Movement Opening)
Shostakovich
Symphony no 14 (Zaporozhye Cossacks Stanzas 8 & 9)
Lutoslawski
Symphony no 3 (Conclusion)
Jeux Venitiens (3rd Movement)
Stravinsky
Agon (4 Trios (Coda)
Schoenberg
A Survivor From Warsaw (Franz Maura;Narrator) (Complete)
Leaving Home 2 – Tonality/Color/America/Music Now
excerpts from:-
Mahler
Symphony no 7 (Opening)
Strauss
Elektra (Denn du Bist Klug) Felicity Palmer (Mezzo Sop)
Webern
5 Pieces For Orchestra (Nos 3-5)
Berg
Violin Concerto (Conclusion) Gidon Kremer (Violin)
Debussy
Jeux (Conclusion)
Messiaen
Et Expecto Resurrectionem Mortuorum (4th Movement – Opening)
Takemitsu
Dream/Window (Conclusion)
Ives
Decoration Day (Conclusion)
Carter
 A Celebration Of 100x150 Notes (Complete)
Bernstein
Symphonic Dances From West Side Story (Excerpt)
Henze
Symphony no 8 (2nd Movement – Conclusion)
Gubaidulina
Zeitgestalten (3rd Movement)
Turnage
Drowned Out (Excerpt)
Knussen
Flourish With Fireworks (Complete)
As of 2015 Warners have released a box set of the complete recordings by Rattle with the CBSO comprising 52 cds

With Philharmonia Orchestra

Bartók, Béla
 Violin Concerto 2 Iona Brown, (vln) Philharmonic Orchestra Decca
Holst, Gustav
Planets Suite EMI
Janáček, Leos
The Cunning Little Vixen EMI
Sinfonietta EMI
Taras Bulba EMI
Davies, Peter Maxwell
Symphony 1 Decca
Milhaud, Darius
La Creation du Monde EMI
Shostakovich, Dimitri
Symphony 10
Sibelius, Jean
Night Ride & Sunrise
Symphony no 5
Stravinsky, Igor
Ebony Concerto EMI

With Vienna Philharmonic Orchestra

Beethoven, Ludwig van
Complete Symphonies Vienna Philharmonic Orchestra (VPO)EMI
Piano Concertos 1 to 5 Brendel (piano) (VPO) Phillips
Symphony 5 (VPO) EMI (Different recording to complete symphony set)
Brahms, Johannes
Violin Concerto Chung (violin) (VPO) EMI
Mahler, Gustav
Symphony No 7 (CD9 of Mahler Feest box set, recorded live at the Royal Concertgebouw May 11, 1995)
Schumann, Robert
Piano Concerto Brendel (piano) (VPO) Decca
Strauss, Richard
Metamorphosen (VPO) EMI

With other orchestras

Bernstein, Leonard
Prelude Fugue and Riffs (London Sinfonia) EMI
Falla, Manuel de
Psyche (London Sinfonietta) Decca
El Retablo de Maese Pedro (London Sinfonietta) Decca
Concerto for Clavichord, Flute, Clarinet, Oboe, Violin, Violin Cello.. (London Sinfonietta) Decca
Gershwin, George
Porgy & Bess London Philharmonic Orchestra (LPO) EMI
Mahler, Gustav
Symphony 10 (Bournemouth SO) EMI
Das Lied von der Erde (Magdalena Kožená, Stuart Skelton, Symphonieorchester des Bayerischen Rundfunks) BR Klassik
Mozart, Wolfgang Amadeus
Cosi Fan Tutti Orchestra of the Age of Enlightenment (OAE) EMI
Operatic Arias: (OAE) Magdalena Kožená (mezzo-soprano) Archiv/DGG
Le nozze di Figaro
At last Comes The Moment-Come Do Not Delay
At Last Comes The Moment-Come Hurry My Beloved
I No Longer Know What I Am
You Ladies, You Know What Love Is
Cosi Fan Tutti
You Look For Fidelity
He's Left Me-In Pity's Name
Love Is A Little Thief
La Clemenza Di Tito
No Longer Shall Hymen Descend
Idomeneo
When Will My Bitter Misfortunes Be Ended?
I Go, But Whither Ye Gods
A Great Soul & Noble Heart
I Forget You?-Do Not Fear O Best Beloved
Prokofiev, Sergei
Piano Concerto no 1  (Gavrilov Piano) (LSO) EMI/Phillips
Rachmaninov, Sergei
Symphony 2 Los Angeles Philharmonic orchestra (LAPO) EMI
Ravel, Maurice
Concerto for the Left Hand Gavrilov (piano) London Symphony Orchestra (LSO) EMI
3 Poems of Stephane Mallarme from LP/CD Felicity Palmer sings Ravel F. Palmer (soprano) (Nash Ensemble) Decca
Schoenberg, Arnold
Pierrot Lunaire (Nash Ensemble) Jane Manning (soprano) Chandos*
Schumann, Robert
Das Paradies und die Peri (Sally Matthews, Mark Padmore, Kate Royal, Bernarda Fink, Andrew Staples, Florian Boesch, Simon Halsey, London Symphony Orchestra) LSO Live*
Strauss, RichardMetamorphosen (1945) (Kremerata Baltica) ECM
Stravinsky, IgorPulcinella (Northern Sinfonia) EMISuites 1&2 (Northern Sinfonia) EMIRite of Spring (National Youth Orchestra) ASVSymphony of Wind Instruments (Nash Ensemble) Chandos3 Japanese Lyrics (Nash Ensemble) Chandos
VangelisChariots of Fire (arr Goodall') (LSO with Rowan Atkinson) UMC
Wagner, Richard
Das Rheingold (Michael Volle, Christian van Horn, Benjamin Bruns, Burkhard Ulrich, Elisabeth Kulman, Annette Dasch, Janina Baechle, Symphonieorchester des Bayerischen Rundfunks) BR Klassik
Webern, Anton
Concierto op 24 (Nash Ensemble) Chandos
Various Composers
The Jazz Album:a Tribute To The Jazz Age(a-g) (London Sinfonietta featuring Harvey and the Wallbangers) EMI
a)Creamer & Layton
After You've Gone
b) Kahn,Erdman,Meyers & Schoebel
Nobody's Sweetheart
c)Harris & Young;;
Sweet Sue
d)Bernard & Black
Dardanella
e)Donaldson & Whiting
My Blue Heaven
f)Donaldson & Kahn
Makin Whoopee
g)McPhail & Michels
San

Other appearances

Round Midnight – Rattle narrates/raps The flower is a key (Sergio Cardénas) 12 cellists of the BPO EMI
Songs for Alexander – By yon castle wa Jocky said to Jenny ca the yowes in your garden fine an gay (Rattle) Conductor John Lubbock Orchestra of St John's Whiteline

Box sets

The Simon Rattle Edition

DVDs

Bach:St Mathews Passion
Directed by Peter Sellars
Magdalena Kožená, Christian Gerhaher, Thomas Quasthoff and Mark Padmore/Rundfunkchor Berlin
Recording from 11 Apr 2010
Bonus: Peter Sellars and Simon Halsey in conversation.
The recording of the concert was originally produced for the Digital Concert Hall, the Berliner Philharmoniker’s video platform on the Internet, and is now released on the Berliner Philharmoniker’s own label. Both the DVD and the Blu-ray editions contain a wealth of bonus material, including extensive booklets with introductory texts, biographies and many colour photos. The audiovisual extras also include an extensive interview with Peter Sellars and Simon Halsey, director of the Rundfunkchor Berlin.
Trip To Asia
Documentary about the Berlin Philharmonic on tour (2009)
Gershwin:Porgy and Bess
The 1993 BBC/Primetime Television production shown on PBS, adapted from the 1989 Glyndebourne staging, directed by Trevor Nunn
Leaving Home
From the channel 4 series 7DVD box set.
Vol 1 – Colour
Vol 2 – The American Way
Vol 3 – After The Wake
Vol 4 – Dancing On A Volcano
Vol 5 – Rythmn
Vol 6 – Three Doorways Through A Dark Landscape
Vol 7 – Threads
Cologne Music Triennale
Messiaen
Éclairs sur l'au dela
Henze
A Tempest
Holt
Sunrise, Yellow Noise Soloist Lisa Milne CBSO
Mahler/Ades(Inaugural Concert with Berlin Philharmoniker) EMI
Mahler
Symphony 5
Ades
Asyla
Rattle conducts Carmina Burana
Orff:
Carmina Burana
Beethoven:
Leonore Overture No. 3, Op. 72b
Handel:
Messiah: Hallelujah Chorus arr. Goossens
Sally Matthews (soprano), Lawrence Brownlee (tenor), Christian Gerhaher (baritone)
Recorded 31 December 2004 at the Philharmonie Berlin.
Falla: Noches en los jardines de Espana
Albéniz:
Navarra
Debussy:
Préludes – Book 2: No. 3, La Puerta del Vino
Estampe No. 2 – La soirée dans Grenada
Falla:
Noches en los jardines de Espana
Homenaje a Debussy
Fantasía Bética
Granados
Goyescas: Quejas ó La Maja y el Ruiseñor
Ravel
Gaspard de la Nuit
Valses nobles et sentimentales
plus:
Alexander Scriabin
Nocturne
Berliner Philharmoniker, Sir Simon Rattle.
Joaquín Achúcarro (piano)
recorded in Berlin, at Berliner Philharmonie, September 7, 2010 Blu-ray & DVD
EUROPA KONZERT 2011 from Madrid
Joaquín Rodrigo
Concierto de Aranjuez (Cañizares flamenco guitarist)
Emmanuel Chabrier
España
Sergey Rachmaninov
Second Symphony
(Recorded live at Teatro Real, Madrid, 1 May 2011 DVD & Blu-ray)
Sophia – Biography of a Violin Concerto
A Jan Schmidt-Garre Film
with Sofia Gubaidulina, Anne-Sophie Mutter & Gidon Kremer
Berlin Philharmonic, Sir Simon Rattle
Waldebuhne in Berlin 1995 American Night
Bernstein
 candide ovt
Prelude, fugue riffs
Gershwin
Rhapsody in Blue
Highlights from Porgy & Bess
Someone to watch over me
I got rhythm
Lincke
 Berliner Luft
European Concert
Brahms
 Piano Concerto 1
Piano 4tet no 1(orch Schoenberg) Barenboim (piano) BPO
Henze Memoirs of an outsider: portrait and concert
Excerpts with Rattle & other conductors contribution by Rattle and the CBSO
The Rite of Spring: A silent film to the music of Stravinsky
A film by Oliver Hermann features the music played by the Berlin phil conducted by Rattle.
Bernstein
Wonderful Town BPO
Wagner – Die Walküre
 Sir Simon Rattle / Berlin Philharmonic Orchestra (Willard White / Eva-Maria Westbroek / Eva Johansson / Robert Gambill) [DVD & Blu-ray] 2 discs [2006]
Story of the Berlin Philharmonic
contributions from Haitink/Rattle/Norrington/Abbado etc. BPO
William Walton – At Haunted End Day
A centenary celebration of the life and work of British composer William Walton with a video release of a 'South Bank Show' special in 1981. Includes interview footage with William Walton and performances featuring Simon Rattle and Yehudi Menuhin.
Maw, Nicholas
Sophie's Choice
Angelika Kirchschlager, Gordon Gietz, Rod Gilfry, Dale Duesing; Orchestra of the Royal Opera House/Simon Rattle; Royal Opera Chorus/Terry Edwards; dir. Trevor Nunn (London, 2002)
Running Time: 223 mins (2 discs)
Label:Opus Arte
Gala Concert 2007BPO released 2009)DVD & Blu-ray
Mussorgsky
Pictures At An Exhibition
Khoavanschina Prelude
Borodin
Symphony No 2
Prince Igor:Polovtsian dances
The Berliner Philharmoniker's European Concert, 1 May 2008 in Moscow's Tchaikovsky Conservatory.
Stravinsky
Symphony in Three Movements
Bruch
Concerto for Violin No. 1, Op. 26 Featured soloist Vadim Repin (Violin)
Beethoven
Symphony No.7 in A major, Op. 92
Berlin Waldbuhne 2009. Russian Rhythmsconductor Sir Simon Rattle, the Berliner Philharmoniker
Tchaikovsky
The Nutcracker, op. 71
Overture
The Christmas Tree
March
Pas de deux (Intrada)
Rachmaninoff
Piano Concerto No.3 in D minor, Op. 30 Yefim Bronfman (Piano)
Stravinsky
Le Sacre du printemps
Lincke
Berliner Luft
From a live concert recorded in 1993 with the Berlin Philharmonic. Released 2009. DVD
Rameau
Les Boreades
Berlioz
La Symphonie Fantastique
Live from Kabelwork Berlin Berlin Philharmoniker conducted by Sir Simon Rattle. Released 2010.
Brahms
Symphony No.4
Double Concerto Truls Mork (Cello)
Wagner
Prelude to Parsifal
 5 Operas From Glyndebourne
 with designs by Maurice Sendak. 3 DVD set. NVC/Warner Classics. Released 2010.
Ravel
 L'enfant et les sortilèges Cynthia Buchan. London Philharmonic, Simon Rattle

External links
Simon Rattle discography at EMI

Discographies of classical conductors
Discographies of British artists